is a Japanese manga series written and illustrated by Hideo Yamamoto. A first series, titled Ichi, was serialized in Shogakukan's seinen manga magazine Weekly Young Sunday in 1993; Ichi the Killer was serialized in the same magazine from 1998 to 2001, with its chapters collected in ten tankōbon volumes. The series revolves around Ichi, a psychologically troubled killing machine, and his confrontation with the yakuza of Kabukichō, Shinjuku.

In 2001, the manga was adapted into a live-action film directed by Takashi Miike. A second live-action film, 1-Ichi, directed by Masahito Tanno, was released in Japan in 2003. A prequel original video animation (OVA), titled Ichi the Killer: Episode 0, animated by AIC, was released in Japan in 2002. The OVA was licensed in North America by Central Park Media and in Australia and New Zealand by Siren Visual.

Plot
Using Ichi as a tool, the "Old Geezer" plots to kill the Anjo yakuza family leader, Yoshio Anjo, and steal his money. With Anjo's death, his top yakuza, Masao Kakihara, sets out to find his leader's murderer; Kakihara searches for Ichi, while the younger man effortlessly kills off the remaining Anjo family members. This cycle of killing and searching leads the two closer together, revealing Ichi's psychological manipulation and Kakihara's obsession of pain and torture. When the two finally meet, they confront their deepest and most suppressed desires, resulting in Ichi's recovery and Kakihara's demise.

Characters
 / 
A psychologically and emotionally disturbed young man, to the point where he acts as a child living in an adult's body. When faced with a confrontation, Ichi bursts into tears and breaks down emotionally. Even with his cowardly personality, Ichi has trained extensively in martial arts. With this training, a concealed blade in his left boot, and a psychological kill switch, Ichi turns into a ruthless killer; hunting down yakuza with a streak for sadism.

A yakuza boss and Ichi's archenemy. He is tired of everything in life and lives to inflict pain, both on those around him as well as himself. His most notable characteristics are the deep gashes on his cheeks which allow him to open his mouth to ridiculous levels, akin to that of a snake, and which are subsequently held together by piercings. He lives his life for sadomasochism.

His real name is unknown. The mastermind behind the unrest in the Anjo family, as well as the puppet master forcing Ichi to kill. He claims to have gained his aged features through plastic surgery and to still be in his early 30's. He has an extremely muscular physique due to abusing steroids. 

The head of the Anjo family. His murder, which is first disguised as a disappearance, leads Kakihara to search for Ichi.

A member of the Old Geezer's group whose primary weapons are firearms.
 / 
An excommunicated member of the Anjo family and a current member of the Old Geezer's group, Inoue is also a heroin addict that has undergone plastic surgery to remain hidden in Shinjuku.

A member of the Funaki yakuza family. He is accused of kidnapping Anjo family's leader. He is bedridden by the resulting torture and is convinced by the Old Geezer's group to employ them to eliminate Kakihara.

Anjo family's hitman and one of Kakihara's closest henchmen. He exhibits a fear similar to Ichi's and desires to prove himself. He is also Takeshi's father.

A hostess and one of Kakihara's friends. She assists Kakihara in locating members of the Old Geezer's group. She is eventually revealed to be assisting the Old Geezer and is eventually killed by Ichi as his last target.

A girl from Ichi's first year in high school. When trying to save Ichi from bullies, she was ostracized and raped.
  
Twin brothers and former members of the Ato yakuza family, recruited by Kakihara, who was also a member of the Ato family. The twins as competitive as they are sadistic, often resulting in shows of one-upmanship fatal to others. Jiro has inhuman strength, while Saburo is good with a short knife.

Shuji's son. He witnesses Ichi crying after his murders. He is also Ichi's successor as the next "killing machine" manipulated by the Old Geezer.

Media

Manga

Written and illustrated Hideo Yamamoto, a short series (which would serve as a prequel), titled , was published in Shogakukan's seinen manga magazine Weekly Young Sunday in 1993, and its chapters were collected in a single tankōbon volume, released on August 5, 1993. Ichi the Killer was serialized in the same magazine from 1998 to 2001. Shogakukan collected its chapters in ten tankōbon volumes, released from June 5, 1998, to July 5, 2001. Shogakukan republished the series in five bunkoban volumes, released from April 14 to August 11, 2007. A five-volume shinsōban edition was released by Shogakukan between February 27 and June 30, 2015.

Live action films

A live action film adaptation, directed by Takashi Miike, premiered in Japan on December 22, 2001. A direct-to-video live action prequel film, titled 1-Ichi, directed by Masato Tanno, was released on January 24, 2003.

Original video animation
A prequel original video animation (OVA) by AIC, titled , was released on VHS and DVD on September 27, 2002.

In North America, the OVA was licensed by Central Park Media and released on DVD on September 21, 2004. It was licensed in Australia and New Zealand by Siren Visual and released on February 21, 2005.

Reception
Tomo Machiyama from Pulp included the series on the "Most Hellish (Untranslated) Manga....ever!!!" list. Machiyama, noting the gruesome and violent content of the series commented: "No wonder this comic was banned in some prefectures, but actually this story, by the creator of PULPs very own Voyeurs, Inc., is a really profound existentialist story. In peaceful consumerist society, how do we make sure we are alive?".

Chris Beveridge from AnimeOnDVD called the OVA "an interesting look into the mind and how it deals with violence, pressure and the mix of sex into everything." Beveridge added that the "over the top violence" "doesn't hit the comical level like Natural Born Killers but rather resides in the disturbing level instead". He concluded: "[i]t's violent, it's sexual and it doesn't make any bones about it." Reviewing the OVA, Bamboo Dong from Anime News Network called it "nothing but an excuse to fit as much sex and violence in a 47 minute excursion as possible", adding that there was potential to use the psychological aspects of the story and explore the human mind, but that "[t]hey were too busy satisfying their testosterone levels". Theron Martin from the same website felt that the story is "perfectly believable" and "convince[s] the viewer that Ichi's lethal tendencies didn't come from nowhere" because it follows the "common elements you hear about in the backgrounds of true killers". He dismissed the "substandard animation" as problematic but praised the music of "heavy driving techno themes" that provide an "edgy mood and tone for the series".

Mike Toole from Anime Jump, commenting the artwork of the OVA, stated: "Its scenery is sparse, its animation jarring and clumsy, its character designs ugly as sin", comparing it to the "drawings of a bored eleven-year-old boy than that of a seasoned animation team", adding, however, that it "feels calculated" and fitting to its "terrifying" and violent world. Toole wrote that the OVA is "like a Cronenberg or De Palma movie, only without any of the subtlety". Toole concluded: "Only hardcore Miike and Ichi devotees will want to own it, but it's certainly worth a look." Chris Feldman from Animation World Network highlighted the writing of the OVA, commenting that "[a]lmost no familiarity with either the manga or movie is required to fully understand what is happening." He added that the OVA would appeal to "anyone looking for an anime that would never get on American TV", commenting that "[a]fter the edit, there wouldn't be enough to fill a half-hour on Adult Swim", and concluded: "for the fans of the movie and manga Ichi the Killer: Episode Zero is a must see".

References

External links
 

2002 anime OVAs
Action anime and manga
Anime International Company
Ichi the Killer
Manga adapted into films
Psychological thriller anime and manga
Seinen manga
Shogakukan manga
Yakuza in anime and manga